Temple Mountain Ski Area was a downhill, or alpine, ski area that operated from 1938 until 2001 on Temple Mountain in the U.S. state of New Hampshire. During peak operation, the ski area featured a quad chairlift, a double chairlift, and multiple T-bars and rope tows. Like many other small ski areas in the country, it closed due to poor weather, rising costs and changing recreational habits. 

Its entrance was located on New Hampshire Route 101, straddling the border of the towns of Temple and Peterborough. 

John and Connie Kieley of Temple Highlands LLC purchased the ski area in 2003. The quad chairlift was sold to Nashoba Valley Ski Area in Massachusetts, while the double was sold to SkyTrans Manufacturing and was later used as a ride at the Milwaukee Zoo.

References

External links

  Temple Mountain - New England Lost Ski Areas Project
 Temple Mountain History - NewEnglandSkiHistory.com
 Friends of the Wapack

Defunct ski areas and resorts in New Hampshire
Protected areas of Hillsborough County, New Hampshire
Nature reserves in New Hampshire
Temple, New Hampshire